Sky Media may refer to:
 Sky Media, the advertising arms of Sky UK and Sky Ireland
 A former name of Sky (New Zealand)
 Sky Media Group, an Estonian radio station network